The Olympic Green is an Olympic Park in Chaoyang District, Beijing, China constructed for the 2008 Summer Olympics. Since then, the streets around the park have been used for an exhibition street race of the FIA GT1 World Championship in 2011, after a race at Goldenport Park Circuit in the vicinity. It again served as an Olympic Park when Beijing hosted the 2022 Winter Olympics.

Venues

Beijing National Stadium 

The Beijing National Stadium or "Bird's Nest" is the centerpiece of this project. It hosted the opening and closing ceremonies, athletics, and football finals of the Games. The stadium has room for 91,000 spectators, but the capacity was reduced to 80,000 after the Olympics. It also served as the site of the opening and closing ceremonies of the 2022 Winter Olympics.

Beijing National Aquatics Center 

The Beijing National Aquatics Center or "Water Cube" hosted the swimming, diving and synchronized swimming events. It has a capacity of  6,000 (17,000 during the 2008 Olympics)and is located next to the National Stadium. It will be the site of the curling competitions during the 2022 Winter Olympics.

Beijing National Indoor Stadium 
The Beijing National Indoor Stadium or "the Fan" held the handball, artistic gymnastics and trampolining events. With a capacity of 19,000, it was the main indoor arena used during the Games.

Beijing National Speed Skating Oval 
The Beijing National Speed Skating Oval is an arena that was built for the 2022 Winter Olympics.

Olympic Green Convention Center 
The Olympic Green Convention Center, also called the National Convention Center, held fencing and, the shooting and fencing disciplines of the modern pentathlon. It is also used as the International Broadcast Center and the Main Press Center (for conventions and exhibitions). The center covers an area of 270,000 square meters.

Olympic Green Hockey Field 
The Olympic Green Hockey Field hosted the field hockey events. It was deconstructed after the Games.

Olympic Green Archery Field 
The Olympic Green Archery Field hosted the archery events. The field occupied  and had a capacity of 5,000. It was dismantled after the Games.

Olympic Green Tennis Center 
The Olympic Green Tennis Center hosted the tennis and wheelchair tennis events. It has 16 courts (10 competition, 6 practice) and a capacity of 17,400. It opened on October 1, 2007.

Promenade
The park itself, outside of the venues constructed on the Olympic Green, hosted some of the athletic events at the 2008 Games. These included the racewalk events, where the loops occurred on the Olympic Green, and the portion of the marathons just outside the National Stadium.

Other parts

Olympic Village 
The Summer Olympic Village housed all the participating athletes. The village is made up of 22 6-story buildings and 20 9-story buildings.

Digital Beijing Building 

The Digital Beijing Building served during the Games as the data center. It was the only building on the Green at the time of the Olympics that was not an event venue. Since then it has been converted into a museum of the Digital Olympics and exhibition space for digital technology companies.

Chinese architect Pei Zhu designed the distinctive , 11-story building near the Aquatic Centre and Convention Center. At the time of the Games, it was the only major facility designed by a Chinese architect. It is meant to explore the relationship between digital forms and traditional Chinese aesthetics, meant to evoke a microchip from two of its façades and a bar code from the other two.

Ling Long Pagoda

The Ling Long Pagoda or Linglong Tower (Multifunctional Studio Tower) (玲珑塔) houses a part of the International Broadcast Center (IBC). It is located near the 2008 Summer Olympics cauldron, on the northwest side of the Bird's Nest Stadium.

Beijing Olympic Tower

Completed and opened in 2014, the  Beijing Olympic Tower's five circular roofs are meant to evoke the Olympic rings; although it has also been described as "a huge nail". The design of the towers themselves were inspired by blades of grass. It is the sixth tallest observation tower in China and the 22nd highest in the world.

See also
 Venues of the 2008 Summer Olympics
 Venues of the 2022 Winter Olympics

References

External links
 

Buildings and structures in Chaoyang District, Beijing
Olympic Parks
Parks in Beijing
Sports venues in Beijing
Sports complexes in China